The 2009 IRB Junior World Rugby Trophy is the second edition of the second-tier world championship for Under 20 national teams. The event is organised by rugby's governing body, the International Rugby Board (IRB). This competition, which is contested by eight men's junior national teams, was held in Nairobi, Kenya from April 21 to May 3.

The competition was won by Romania. Original plans called for them to receive an automatic berth into the following year's edition of the IRB Junior World Championship, the top tier of the IRB under-20 championship; however, Romania ultimately did not receive that berth after the Junior World Championship was reduced from 16 teams to 12.

Venues

Pools

Pool A

{| class="wikitable" style="text-align: center;"
|-
!width="200"|Team
!width="20"|Pld
!width="20"|W
!width="20"|D
!width="20"|L
!width="20"|TF
!width="20"|PF
!width="20"|PA
!width="25"|+/-
!width="20"|BP
!width="20"|Pts
|-
|align=left| 
| 3 || 2 || 0 || 1 || 18 || 125 || 72 || +53 || 4 || 12
|-
|align=left| 
| 3 || 2 || 0 || 1 || 18 || 117 || 54 || +63 || 3 || 11
|-
|align=left| 
| 3 || 2 || 0 || 1 || 18 || 150 || 53 || +97 || 2 || 10
|-
|align=left| 
| 3 || 0 || 0 || 3 || 1 || 22 || 235 || −213 || 0 || 0
|}

All match times are East Africa Time (UTC+3).

Pool B

{| class="wikitable" style="text-align: center;"
|-
!width="200"|Team
!width="20"|Pld
!width="20"|W
!width="20"|D
!width="20"|L
!width="20"|TF
!width="20"|PF
!width="20"|PA
!width="25"|+/-
!width="20"|BP
!width="20"|Pts
|-
|align=left| 
| 3 || 3 || 0 || 0 || 21 || 141 || 51 || +90 || 2 || 14
|-
|align=left| 
| 3 || 2 || 0 || 1 || 17 || 119 || 69 || +50 || 3 || 11
|-
|align=left| 
| 3 || 1 || 0 || 2 || 82 || 119 || 12 || −37 || 1 || 5
|-
|align=left| 
| 3 || 0 || 0 || 3 || 7 || 54 || 157 || −103 || 0 || 0
|}

All match times are East Africa Time (UTC+3).

Playoffs
All match times are East Africa Time (UTC+3).

7th place

5th place

3rd place

Final

See also
2009 IRB Junior World Championship

External links
Official website

2009
Sport in Nairobi
International rugby union competitions hosted by Kenya
2009 rugby union tournaments for national teams
rugby union
rugby union